Jimmy Butler (February 20, 1921February 18, 1945) was an American, juvenile, motion-pictures actor, active in the 1930s and early 1940s.

Butler was the son of Mr. and Mrs. Merrill W. Butler. He gained early acting experience at the Pasadena Community Playhouse.

Butler earned acclaim for his role in the 1933 film Only Yesterday, his screen debut, and in 1934 his career got another significant boost when the actor earned lavish critical plaudits for his portrayal of Jim Wade in Manhattan Melodrama. Later he played one of the young protagonists, Boka, in No Greater Glory. 

On February 15, 1941, Butler married singer Jean Fahrney. They initially kept the marriage secret, but it became known in March 1941. They remained wed until his death.

In 1945, Butler died in World War II combat in the town of Theding, France.

Filmography

Only Yesterday (1933) - Jim Jr.
Beloved (1934) - Charles Hausmann, as a boy
No Greater Glory (1934) - Boka
Manhattan Melodrama (1934) - Jim - as a Boy
Mrs. Wiggs of the Cabbage Patch (1934) - Billy Wiggs
I'll Fix It (1934) - Bobby Grimes
Romance in Manhattan (1935) - Frank Dennis
When a Man's a Man (1935) - Jimmy - Newsboy
Laddie (1935) - Leon Stanton
Dinky (1935) - Cadet Lane
The Awakening of Jim Burke (1935) - Jimmy Burke
The Dark Angel (1935) - Gerald as a Child (uncredited)
Show Them No Mercy! (1935) - Boy at Service Station (uncredited)
Battle of Greed (1937) - Danny Storm
Stella Dallas (1937) - Con Morrison - Grown Up
County Fair (1937) - Buddy Williams - Julie's Brother
Wells Fargo (1937) - Nick Pryor Jr. (uncredited)
The Shopworn Angel (1938) - Jack - Elevator Boy (uncredited)
Boys Town (1938) - Paul Ferguson
Winter Carnival (1939) - Larry Grey
Nurse Edith Cavell (1939) - Jean
The Escape (1939) - Jim Rogers
Call a Messenger (1939) - Bob Prichard
Star Dust (1940) - Minor Role (uncredited)
Golden Gloves (1940) - Willie Burke (uncredited)
Military Academy (1940) - Cadet Dewey
Naval Academy (1941) - Matt Cooper
Rise and Shine (1941) - Student Manager (uncredited)
Uncle Joe (1941) - Bob
Tough As They Come (1942) - Gene Bennett
The Hard Way (1943) - Boy (uncredited)
This Is the Army (1943) - Soldier (uncredited)
Someone to Remember (1943) - Bob Edgar (uncredited)
Corvette K-225 (1943) - Rating (uncredited)
Girl Crazy (1943) - Student (uncredited) (final film role)

References

External links

1921 births
1945 deaths
Male actors from Akron, Ohio
American male film actors
United States Army personnel killed in World War II
20th-century American male actors
United States Army soldiers

ru:Батлер, Джимми